Nectocotis rusmithi is an Ordovician nectocaridid, differing from Nectocaris in the possession of an internal skeletal element.

References

Fossil taxa described in 2019
Late Ordovician animals
Nectocarididae
Ordovician animals of North America